In Tibetan Buddhism, Siṃhamukhā (Tib. Senge Dongma) or Siṃhavaktra, also known as the Lion Face Dakini or Lion-headed Dakini, is a wisdom dakini of the Dzogchen tradition. She is represented as a fierce dakini with the head of a snow lion. Her mouth is depicted with a roar, symbolizing untamed fury and jubilant laughter. Her roar  disperses discursive thoughts. She is naked, symbolizing that she herself is completely free of discursive thought.

She is considered to be an emanation or manifestation of Guhyajnana Dakini (the principal Dakini teacher of Padmasambhava in Uddiyana), or of Mandarava (one of his consorts), or of Sangwa Yeshe. She represents the accomplished female practitioner. As a meditation deity, her main function is averting magical attacks.

According to both John Reynolds and John Lash, she is the Indian equivalent of the Egyptian goddess Sekmet.

Description
According to the curators of the Himalayan Art Resources, the wisdom Dakini Simhamukha is visualized

Retinue
According to John Reynolds, Simhamukha

Lineages
There are at least two major lineages of transmission, one in the Nyingma and another in the Sakya school. Although according to the tertön Nyangral Nyima Özer, the Nyingma Simhamukha is based on the Sakya tradition of Bari Lotsawa.

Nyingma
According to the terma (in Tibetan: gong ter, 'a treasure of the mind') tradition of the Nyingma school, Senge Dongma is a manifestation of Padmasambhava, a secret spiritual form of Guru Rinpoche specifically for removing spiritual obstacles and negativity. Accomplished practitioners often visualize Padmasambhava as Simhamukha during their meditative practices. According to Jamyang Khyentse Wangpo,

Sakya
The Sakya lineage began with a terma discovered by Bari Lotsawa (1040–1111), who transmitted the teachings to Sachen Kunga Nyingpo. According to Jamyang Khyentse Wangpo,

Termas
 Tertön Sogyal is credited with discovering and transcribing a terma he found in a remote hermitage.
 Tsasum Lingpa, Lion-Faced Dakini Practice that Subdues All Devils.

Sadhanas
Dudjom Rinpoche, A Daily 'Hand-Clapping' Practice of Siṃhamukhā.
Jamyang Khyentse Wangpo, in The Excellent Vase of Precious Jewels (Rin-chen bum bzang), provides three sadhanas composed by Padma Gargyi Wangchuk (Jamgon Kongtrul).
Lama Kunga Tartse Rinpoche, Sadhana of the Blue Lion-headed Dakini.

See also

Bodongpa
Dorje Pakmo
Krodikali
Machig Labdrön
Mandarava
Narodakini
Nubchen Sangye Yeshe
Prajnaparamita
Vajrayogini
Yeshe Tsogyal

References

Citations

Works cited

Further reading

External links
Simhamukha Main Page at Himalayan Art Resources
Siṃhamukhā Series at Lotsawa House

Dakinis
Mythological lions